Dedicated to You: Kurt Elling Sings the Music of Coltrane and Hartman is a 2009 live album by Kurt Elling, recorded at the Lincoln Center's American Songbook series.

The album is a tribute to the 1963 recording John Coltrane and Johnny Hartman by saxophonist John Coltrane and vocalist Johnny Hartman, and also features music from Coltrane's Ballads (1962).

At the 52nd Grammy Awards (held on January 31, 2010), Elling won the Grammy Award for Best Jazz Vocal Album for his performance on this album. Elling had previously been nominated for seven Grammy awards.

Track listing
"All or Nothing at All" (Arthur Altman, Jack Lawrence) – 6:52
"It's Easy to Remember (And So Hard to Forget)" (Lorenz Hart, Richard Rodgers) – 4:07
"Dedicated to You" (Sammy Cahn, Saul Chaplin, Hy Zaret) – 6:35
"What's New?" (Johnny Burke, Bob Haggart) – 2:40
"Lush Life" (Billy Strayhorn) – 4:39
"Autumn Serenade" (Peter DeRose, Sammy Gallop) – 3:14
"Say It (Over and Over Again)" (Frank Loesser, Jimmy McHugh) – 6:40
"They Say It's Wonderful" (Irving Berlin) – 4:01
"My One and Only Love" (Guy Wood, Robert Mellin) – 3:26
"Nancy (With the Laughing Face)" (Phil Silvers, Jimmy Van Heusen) – 4:56
Acknowledgements – :40
"You Are Too Beautiful" (Richard Rodgers, Lorenz Hart) – 8:10

Personnel
Performance
Kurt Elling - vocal
Ernie Watts - tenor saxophone
Laurence Hobgood - piano, arranger
ETHEL:
Cornelius Dufallo - violin
Mary Rowell - violin
Ralph Farris - viola
Dorothy Lawson - cello
Clark Sommers - double bass
Ulysses Owens - drums
Jim Gailloreto - arranger
Production
Kurt Elling and Laurence Hobgood - producers
Mary Hogan - A&R
May Ann Topper - executive producer, management
Chris Dunn - executive producer
David Earl Taylor - production coordination
Larissa Collins - art direction
Scott Stauffer - sound design
Matt Berman - lighting design
Bryan Farina and Rob Macomber - engineers
Dave O'Donnell - mixing
Paul Blakemore - mastering
Mike Gassel - package design
John Abbott - photography

References

Tribute albums
Kurt Elling live albums
2009 live albums
Concord Records live albums
Albums recorded at the Lincoln Center for the Performing Arts
John Coltrane tribute albums
Grammy Award for Best Jazz Vocal Album